The Warner River is a  river located in central New Hampshire in the United States. It is a tributary of the Contoocook River, part of the Merrimack River watershed.

The Warner River begins at the outlet of Todd Lake in Bradford, New Hampshire, 300 meters upstream of the confluence of the West Branch. The river flows east, receiving the outlet of Lake Massasecum, and enters the town of Warner. The small river has a long whitewater section in western Warner, passing under the Waterloo Covered Bridge next to an old railroad station, then reaches Interstate 89, after which the river flattens and meanders over gravel bars. A small waterfall at Davisville interrupts the flatwater, which resumes to the river's end, just north of the village of Contoocook, New Hampshire, in the town of Hopkinton.

New Hampshire Route 103 follows the Warner River for most of the river's length.

See also

List of rivers of New Hampshire

References

Tributaries of the Merrimack River
Rivers of New Hampshire
Rivers of Merrimack County, New Hampshire